Kingprince is the second album by Cassino, released digitally on December 9, 2009. It was recorded, produced and released independently by the band in Nashville, TN.  "Kingprince" features three tracks rerecorded from the band's debut album, "Sounds of Salvation": "The Gin War," "The Ice Factory," and "Boomerang."

Track listing
All songs written by Cassino
All lyrics written by Nick Torres

"Djom"
"Kingprince"
"The Gin War"
"The Ice Factory"
"Maddie Bloom"
"Amelia"
"Cannonball"
"Debrickashaw"
"Boomerang"
"Ghost"
"The Levee"
"The River"

Personnel
Nick Torres: vocals, guitar, piano, bass guitar
Ed Puckett: guitar, electric guitars, harmonica, organ
Tripper Ryder: bass guitar
Craig Krampf: drums, percussion
Kevin Arrowsmith: violin, mandolin, electric mandolin

References 

2009 albums
Cassino (band) albums